Melanditae or Melanditai  is the name of a Thracian tribe that were mentioned in Xenophon's Anabasis.

References

See also
Thracian tribes

Ancient tribes in Thrace
Thracian tribes